13 Flavours Of Doom is the sixth album by Canadian hardcore punk band D.O.A. It was released in 1992 on band member Joe Keithley's own record label, Sudden Death Records, and also in the UK on Alternative Tentacles. In spite of its title, the album actually had fourteen tracks – the last one not being numbered on the CD inlay.

Track listing

Credits
 Joe "Joey Shithead" Keithley – guitar, vocals
 Brian Roy Goble – bass, vocals
 Ken Jensen – drums, vocals
 John Wright – keyboards, vocals
 Recorded at Profile Studios, Vancouver, British Columbia, Canada
 Produced by John Wright
 Engineered by Brian Else

References

External links
 Sudden Death Records band page

1992 albums
D.O.A. (band) albums
Alternative Tentacles albums
Sudden Death Records albums